Hans Frei (30 April 1868 – 14 March 1947) was a Swiss sculptor. His work was part of the sculpture event in the art competition at the 1924 Summer Olympics.

References

1868 births
1947 deaths
19th-century Swiss sculptors
20th-century Swiss sculptors
Swiss sculptors
Olympic competitors in art competitions
Artists from Basel-Stadt
20th-century Swiss male artists